Baldwin III may refer to:

Baldwin III, Count of Flanders (940–962)
Baldwin III, Count of Hainaut (1088–1120)
Baldwin III of Jerusalem (1130–1162)
Baldwin III of Ramla (early 1130s– 1187 or 1186–1188)